Darnell Lamont Boone (born January 21, 1980) is an American professional boxer. Despite having never challenged for a world title, Boone is notable for facing several future world champions over the course of his career, from middleweight to light heavyweight. In 2004, he was the first to score a knockdown against undefeated Olympic gold medalist Andre Ward, who went on to win a unanimous decision over Boone. In 2010, Boone caused a major upset when he knocked out future world champion Adonis Stevenson, who later gained revenge by knocking out Boone in 2013. Boone also defeated Willie Monroe Jr. in 2011, who later challenged twice for a world title. Other world champions Boone has faced include Jean Pascal, Erislandy Lara, and Sergey Kovalev (twice).

Background
Having gotten a late start into the sport of boxing, Boone had just ten amateur fights before turning professional in 2004. Boone had originally gotten into boxing after attending his younger brother's boxing gym. In his first training session, he sparred with future world champion Kelly Pavlik.

Professional boxing career
Boone held a record of 6-2-1, with the two losses coming to former IBF middleweight contender Walid Smichet and future IBA contender Walter Wright. Ward, was a heavy favorite despite being just 6-0, and Boone took the fight on just one week's notice. Despite knocking down Ward twice in the fight, he lost a unanimous decision.

After improving to 10-3-1, Boone faced future two-time world title contender Enrique Ornelas, and Anthony Thompson, losing unanimous decisions in each.

After drawing on points against another future title contender in Lajuan Simon, Boone lost a decision to then-undefeated (12-0) Jean Pascal.

In April 2010, Boone was matched up with future lineal, Ring, and world titleholder Adonis Stevenson, in another fight Boone took on short notice against an undefeated fighter as Stevenson was 13-0 at the time. Boone at the time was 16-15-2, and on a five-fight losing streak (the first three fights being decision losses to Craig McEwan, Erislandy Lara, and Edwin Rodriguez, respectively). In an upset Boone finished Stevenson 17 seconds into the second round. Leading up to the fight, Boone had been self-trained.

Boone took another short-notice fight against future champion and then, 17-0-1 Sergey Kovalev in a light heavyweight bout. Boone fought hard, knocking Kovalev down but later losing a point and ultimately a split decision. Boone was then defeated via first-round TKO against Marco Antonio Periban.

Boone was then matched up with future world title challenger and then-undefeated 10-0 Willie Monroe Jr. In March 2013, Boone fought Stevenson again in a rematch, losing via sixth-round KO.

Boone last fought in November 2018, making his cruiserweight debut, a draw.

Professional boxing record

References

External links

"Boxing Darnell Boone beating guys with good records" at vindy.com
"Boone's 'Knockout' re-energizes boxing career" at wytv.com

1980 births
Living people
Boxers from Youngstown, Ohio
African-American boxers
American male boxers
Light-heavyweight boxers
Middleweight boxers
Super-middleweight boxers
21st-century African-American sportspeople
20th-century African-American people